Portage—Neepawa was a federal electoral district in Manitoba, Canada, that was represented in the House of Commons of Canada from 1949 to 1968.

This riding was created in 1947 from parts of Macdonald,  Neepawa and Portage la Prairie ridings.

It was abolished in 1966 when it was redistributed into Dauphin,  Lisgar, Marquette, Portage and Winnipeg South Centre ridings.

Election results

See also 

 List of Canadian federal electoral districts
 Past Canadian electoral districts

External links 

Former federal electoral districts of Manitoba